Pecado is a monotypic genus of dwarf spiders containing the single species, Pecado impudicus. It was first described by G. Hormiga & N. Scharff in 2005, and has only been found in Spain, Morocco, and Algeria.

See also
 List of Linyphiidae species (I–P)

References

Linyphiidae
Monotypic Araneomorphae genera
Spiders of Africa